Şuşanın dağları başı dumanlı — Azerbaijani patriotic folk song about Shusha, where this town is compared to a beautiful girl. This song was written by famous Azerbaijani khanende (mugam-singer) Khan Shushinski, and after his death was folklorized. The song is performed with accompaniment of tar and kamancha.

External links
 Performing by Khan Shushinski.

Sources 
 Музыкалная академия, выпуск 1. "Композитор". 2002
 V. Muxtaroğlu. Xan Zirvəsi.

Azerbaijani folk songs
Azerbaijani songs
Azerbaijani music